Garry Cooper Jr. is an American entrepreneur, scientist, and business leader. He currently serves as the CEO of Rheaply, an enterprise asset management company for the circular economy, which he co-founded in 2015.  He is also a founding member of LongJump, a venture capital firm dedicated to funding underrepresented founders.

Early life and education
Cooper attended Stivers School for the Arts in Dayton, Ohio, where he focused on mathematics and violin, and graduated in 2002.  He then attended Indiana University Bloomington, where he graduated in 2007 with a BS in Mathematics and a BA in Chemistry.

After graduating from college, Cooper enrolled in graduate school at Northwestern University, where he studied neuroscience with a focus on Parkinson’s disease. He earned his doctorate in 2014, as well as a Certificate in Management from Northwestern’s Kellogg School of Management in 2012.

Career
While pursuing his PhD at Northwestern, Cooper realized that many labs and departments were throwing away research assets  — the same equipment and consumables that were needed in one lab would sit unused in another. In an effort to solve this problem, Cooper co-founded Rheaply in 2015 in Chicago, along with Peter Tucker and Tyler Skelton. The name is a portmanteau of “research” and “cheaply,” and the company started out as a peer-to-peer, virtual marketplace for laboratory equipment and consumables within higher education. Over time, Rheaply has grown to use circular economy principles and technology to bring better efficiencies to resource recovery and reuse within and across all types of organizations — from federal, state, and local governments, to commercial enterprise.

Since its founding, Rheaply has raised numerous rounds of funding, including a $2.5M seed round in 2020, an $8M Series A in 2021, a $2.2M InterSeries round in June 2021, and a $20M raise in 2022. The company also won Revolution’s Rise of the Rest Equity Edition in 2020, and has been selected to multiple cohorts, including the initial cohort for 1871’s Advanced Member Program, the 2019 MIT Solve Class, and the Goldman Sachs 2021 Launch With GS Cohort.

In the wake of the COVID-19 pandemic in spring of 2020, Cooper joined Chicago mayor Lori Lightfoot to announce the Chicago PPE Market, a partnership between Rheaply and the City of Chicago to help small businesses and nonprofits obtain protective equipment for their employees.

In March of 2021, Cooper and a group of fellow Chicago startup founders launched LongJump, a first check venture fund designed to invest in local underrepresented founders. Cooper is also a board member of P33 Chicago, an initiative designed to drive Chicago’s tech growth, and in 2021 he was selected by Mayor Lightfoot to assist in the city’s “Come Back to Move Forward” campaign, designed to bring tech talent back to Chicago.

In relation to his neuroscience work, Cooper remains an adjunct assistant professor at Northwestern, focused on Parkinson’s disease research. He is also a former board member of the American Parkinson’s Disease Association.

Awards and honors
 Crain’s 40 U 40 2020
 Forbes Next 1000
 Entrepreneur Pandemic Response issue cover 
 Chicago Magazine’s New Power 30, March 2021
 LinkedIn 2022 Top Voices in the Green Economy

References

Living people
Year of birth missing (living people)
American chief executives
American venture capitalists
African-American business executives
Businesspeople from Chicago
Indiana University Bloomington alumni
Northwestern University alumni
21st-century African-American people